The Australian Army Medical Women's Service (AAMWS) was an armed services organisation which existed from 1942 until 1951.

Growing out of the St John Ambulance Voluntary Aid Detachments, it was formed in December 1942 and its members served as nurses in military hospitals in the Middle East, Australia and, with the British Commonwealth Occupation Force, in Japan. In 1951, the AAMWS was merged into the Royal Australian Army Nursing Corps.

Notable members
 Alice Ross-King, described as Australia's most decorated woman, served during World War II
 Camilla Wedgwood, noted anthropologist, served from 1944 to 1946

References
Australian Army Medical Women's Service (AAMWS) (1942 - 1951)
Australian War Memorial

Medical Women
Army medical administrative corps
Army medical units and formations of Australia
Military units and formations established in 1942
1942 establishments in Australia
Military units and formations disestablished in 1951